Danielle Riley Keough (born May 29, 1989) is an American actress. She made her feature film debut at age 20, appearing in a supporting part in the musical biopic The Runaways (2010), portraying Joan Jett. She subsequently starred in the independent thriller The Good Doctor (2011), before being cast in a minor role in Steven Soderbergh's comedy film Magic Mike (2012). She had her first big-budget release in the action feature Mad Max: Fury Road (2015).

In 2016, Keough had her breakthrough role as an escort in the first season of the anthology series The Girlfriend Experience, earning a Golden Globe Award nomination for Best Actress. Her performance as a wayward young woman in the drama American Honey (2016) earned her further acclaim, including an Independent Spirit Award nomination for Best Supporting Female. She went on to star in the horror film It Comes at Night (2017), Soderbergh's heist film Logan Lucky (both 2017), and had further horror film appearances in The House That Jack Built (2018) and The Lodge (2019). Following a leading role in the comedy-drama Zola (2020), Keough co-directed the drama War Pony (2022), which won the Caméra d'Or. She has since starred in the thriller series The Terminal List (2022).

Keough is currently starring as the title character in the drama series Daisy Jones & The Six (2023).

Early life
Keough was born on May 29, 1989, at Providence Saint John's Health Center in Santa Monica, California. She is the eldest child of singer-songwriter Lisa Marie Presley (1968–2023) and musician Danny Keough, and the eldest grandchild of Elvis Presley and actress and businesswoman Priscilla Presley. Keough's father met her mother while performing as a bass guitarist in her mother's band. She had a brother, Benjamin Storm Keough (1992–2020), and has two half-sisters, twins Harper and Finley, from her mother's fourth marriage to Michael Lockwood. According to Keough, her father's ancestry is Irish and mostly Sephardic Jewish (Portuguese-Jewish) and Ashkenazi Jewish (Eastern European Jews), whereas her maternal grandfather, Elvis Presley, was allegedly of Creek, Cherokee, Scots-Irish and Norman descent; Keough's maternal grandmother, Priscilla, is of part Norwegian descent.

When Keough was five years old, her parents divorced, and her mother was briefly married to Michael Jackson from 1994 to 1996. Of her upbringing, Keough said that she "grew up very privileged with my mother, but my dad didn't live like that. And I think experiencing both sides has been helpful. My father had mattresses on the floor of his apartments. He lived in cabins and trailer parks. He just didn't have much money... Actually, my memories of growing up with him were so colourful and eccentric and fun. It was a good vibe, you know? When I was like eight I told him, 'I want to grow up and be poor like you!' He was eating a bowl of cereal. I didn't realize how wildly offensive that was!" Keough was raised primarily by her father in Hawaii and Los Angeles, though she at times lived at her mother's Los Angeles home, as well as at the Graceland Estate in Memphis, Tennessee, which was inherited by her mother following her grandfather Elvis's death.

In 2002, when Keough was 13 years old, her mother married actor Nicolas Cage, though this marriage was also short-lived, ending two years later in divorce. For a time, Keough attended a public school in the San Fernando Valley, but was ultimately homeschooled due to her having to frequently travel between her parents' homes.

Career

2004–2008: Modeling 
Prior to beginning a film career, Keough began modeling at age 15, appearing in the Autumn/Winter 2004 ready-to-wear show for Dolce & Gabbana, followed by the Christian Dior ready-to-wear show for the Spring/Summer 2005 collection. Keough subsequently appeared on the United States cover of Vogue in August 2004. She subsequently appeared on the cover of the Japanese Elle magazine and Korean Vogue, both in 2005, as well as the covers of the French magazines Jalouse and L'Officiel, also in 2005.

2009–2015: Film career beginnings 
In 2010, at the age of 20, Keough made her film debut in The Runaways based on the 1970s all-girl rock band of the same name. Keough portrayed the role of Marie Currie, the sister to Cherie Currie, the band's lead singer, portrayed by Dakota Fanning. The film also starred Kristen Stewart and Tatum O'Neal and premiered in 2010 at the Sundance Film Festival to favorable reviews.

In April 2011, Keough starred as the female lead in the drama The Good Doctor alongside Orlando Bloom and Taraji P. Henson. Keough portrayed Diane Nixon, a young patient with a kidney infection who is kept ill to make her doctor gain the respect he craves. The film received mixed reviews from critics.
In May 2010, she replaced actress Olivia Thirlby as the protagonist in the werewolf drama Jack & Diane alongside Juno Temple, who portrays her love interest. Filming took place in New York City, and in May 2011 Magnolia Pictures picked up the film for distribution; it was released theatrically in November 2012.

In September 2011, Keough joined the Steven Soderbergh film Magic Mike, alongside Channing Tatum, Matthew McConaughey and Alex Pettyfer, about a group of male strippers. Keough portrayed the role of Nora, a young stripper. The film was released in June 2012. Keough also co-starred in the independent drama Yellow, alongside Sienna Miller, Luke Wilson and David Morse, followed by a supporting role opposite Milo Ventimiglia in the independent vampire film Kiss of the Damned, which premiered at the 2012 Venice Film Festival.

On August 4, 2013, the Australian fashion brand Bonds announced that Keough had been signed as "Summer 2013 ambassador". In October 2013, Keough co-starred in the video for Justin Timberlake's "TKO", portraying a bitter girlfriend who knocks out Timberlake and ties him to the back of a pickup truck, dragging him through the desert and throwing him off a cliff.

Keough appeared in director So Yong Kim's short film Spark and Light commissioned by fashion brand Miu Miu in 2014. Keough had a supporting role in Mad Max: Fury Road, the fourth installment of the Mad Max series. The film was released in May 2015 to critical and commercial success.

In December 2015, Dixieland was released by IFC Films, in which Keough starred as a woman living in a Mississippi trailer park who becomes embroiled in a crime. The film had previously screened at the Tribeca Film Festival in April 2015.

2016–present: Breakthrough and subsequent roles
In January 2016, Keough's following film, the lesbian drama Lovesong, premiered at the Sundance Film Festival. The film, directed by So Yong Kim, features Keough co-starring with Jena Malone as two best friends who fall in love with each other. Keough had her breakthrough role portraying a law student-turned-escort in the first season of the anthology series The Girlfriend Experience, based on the film of the same name from director Steven Soderbergh. The 13-episode series premiered on Starz on April 10, 2016. Her performance in The Girlfriend Experience garnered rave reviews and awards buzz from critics. She went on to receive a Golden Globe nomination for Best Performance by an Actress in a Limited Series or Motion Picture Made for Television.

Also in 2016, Keough appeared in Andrea Arnold's drama film American Honey, alongside Shia LaBeouf. The film premiered in competition at the 2016 Cannes Film Festival, where it won the Jury Prize. Keough received praise for her role in the film, and received a nomination at the Film Independent Spirit Awards for Best Supporting Female. The same year, she appeared in  The Discovery directed by Charlie McDowell. It had its world premiere at the Sundance Film Festival on January 20, 2017, and was released on March 31, 2017, by Netflix. She subsequently starred as the daughter of a dysfunctional family in the drama We Don't Belong Here (2017), co-starring with Catherine Keener and Anton Yelchin, which was filmed in 2014. Keough's subsequent film was It Comes at Night, an apocalyptic-themed horror film, in which she starred opposite Joel Edgerton and Christopher Abbott, and directed by Trey Edward Shults. The film was released theatrically in the United Kingdom and United States in the early summer of 2017.

In August 2017, it was announced that Keough had launched her own production company called Felix Culpa with producer Gina Gammell. Plans are already in place to adapt three novels, including: Sweet Lamb of Heaven: A Novel, the graphic novel Heartthrob, and The Curse of Beauty: The Scandalous & Tragic Life of Audrey Munson, America's First Supermodel. She also appeared in Steven Soderbergh's heist comedy Logan Lucky, released in August 2017.

In 2018, Keough appeared in a number of films, including the independent drama-thriller Welcome the Stranger, followed by the Netflix-released thriller Hold the Dark, directed by Jeremy Saulnier, and the Barry Levinson-directed television film Paterno, a biographical film about Joe Paterno released through HBO in April 2018. In May 2018, Keough debuted two films at the 2018 Cannes Film Festival: Lars von Trier's controversial psychological horror film The House That Jack Built, which was subsequently given a limited release in the United States by IFC Films, and David Robert Mitchell's neo-noir Under the Silver Lake, which was given a limited release in April 2019.

Next, Keough starred in the lead role in the psychological horror film The Lodge (2019), portraying a woman raised in a cult. The film, which premiered at the 2019 Sundance Film Festival before being released theatrically in February 2020, garnered Keough praise, with Michael Roffman of Consequence of Sound deeming it a "career-best performance." Justin Chang of the Los Angeles Times also lauded her performance as the film's "strongest asset. [Keough] can seize and hold the screen with electrifying force." Keough subsequently had a lead role opposite Alicia Vikander in the thriller film Earthquake Bird, directed by Wash Westmoreland and based on the 2001 novel of the same name, which premiered at the British Film Institute in October 2019 before being released digitally via Netflix in mid-November 2019.

In early 2019, Keough was cast in the Netflix-produced psychological thriller The Devil All the Time, based on Donald Ray Pollock's 2011 novel of the same name. The project began filming in Alabama in the spring of that year, and premiered on Netflix in September 2020. On November 19, 2019, it was announced that Keough had joined the cast of the upcoming Amazon series Daisy Jones & The Six in a leading role, portraying a rock musician in the 1970s. In January 2020, the comedy-drama Zola, premiered at the Sundance Film Festival.

In 2022, Keough co-directed and produced with Gina Gammell War Pony, which had its world premiere at the 2022 Cannes Film Festival in May 2022. It won the Caméra d'Or award for best first feature.

Personal life 
In February 2015, Keough married Australian stuntman Ben Smith-Petersen in Napa, California, having announced their engagement the previous year. The couple had met while filming Mad Max: Fury Road.

Her brother, Benjamin Storm Keough (born October 21, 1992), died of a self-inflicted gunshot wound on July 12, 2020.

Her mother Lisa Marie Presley died from a cardiac arrest on January 12, 2023 at age 54. During a memorial tribute read on behalf of Keough, her husband revealed that the pair had a daughter in 2022.

Filmography

Film

Television

Music videos

Accolades

References

Sources

External links 

Riley Keough at Elvis Presley News

1989 births
21st-century American actresses
Actresses from Hawaii
Actresses from Los Angeles
Actresses from Memphis, Tennessee
American film actresses
American television actresses
American people of Cherokee descent
American people of Irish descent
American people of Muscogee descent
American people of Norman descent
American people of Norwegian descent
American people of Portuguese-Jewish descent
American people of Scotch-Irish descent
Female models from California
Living people
American people of Sephardic-Jewish descent
American people who self-identify as being of Native American descent
Directors of Caméra d'Or winners
Elvis Presley
Priscilla Presley
Presley family